"Hitz" is a single from English record production duo Chase & Status, featuring vocals from British rapper Tinie Tempah. The single was released in the United Kingdom on 15 July 2011 as the fourth single from their second studio album, No More Idols. It peaked at number 39 on the UK Singles Chart and number 11 on the UK Dance Chart. The song features a spoken word sample from the 1973 film The Harder They Come. On 22 February 2012, it was featured in the BBC drama series Waterloo Road. Tinie re-used the "tick, tick, tick, tick, boom to you fellas" vocal sample on the Demonstration bonus track "5 Minutes", produced by Zane Lowe.

Background
Originally the demo was sent to British rapper Dubbledge but Chase & Status later managed to get Tinie Tempah on the song instead. Dubbledge released his version titled "Chess" for free on 6 October 2011. The single version of the song features an additional chorus performed between Tempah's verses by Kivanc Sezen, which does not appear on the album version. The single version was released on 15 July 2011 as a digital download in the United Kingdom. A music video to accompany the release of "Hitz" was first released onto YouTube on 10 June 2011 at a total length of three minutes and fourteen seconds. The music video was filmed in New York and was directed by AG Rojas. The video portrays Tempah and Chase & Status performing the track in an underground club, while a young boy struggles to survive up on the surface.

Track listing
 12" vinyl
 "Hitz" (Delta Heavy Remix) – 4:35
 "Hitz" (16bit Remix) – 4:13

 Promotional CD single No. 1
 "Hitz" (Single Version) – 3:08
 "Hitz" (Wretch 32 Remix) – 3:30

 Promotional CD single No. 2
 "Hitz" (Wretch 32 Remix) – 3:30
 "Hitz" (16bit Remix) – 4:13
 "Hitz" (Delta Heavy Remix) – 4:35
 "Hitz" (Dillon Francis Remix) – 4:17

 Promotional CD single No. 3
 "Hitz" (Wretch 32 Remix) – 3:30
 "Hitz" (Original Clean Single Version) – 3:08
 "Hitz" (Instrumental) – 3:08

 Digital download EP
 "Hitz" (Single Version) – 3:08
 "Hitz" (Wretch 32 Remix) – 3:30
 "Hitz" (16bit Remix) – 4:13
 "Hitz" (Delta Heavy Remix) – 4:35
 "Hitz" (Dillon Francis Remix) – 4:17

Credits and personnel
Lead vocals – Tinie Tempah
Producers – Saul Milton, William Kennard
Songwriters – Saul Milton, Patrick Okogwu, William Kennard, Kivanc Sezen
Backing vocals – Kivanc Sezen
Label: Mercury Records

Chart performance

Release history

References

2011 singles
Chase & Status songs
Tinie Tempah songs
Mercury Records singles
RAM Records singles
Song recordings produced by Chase & Status
Songs written by Saul Milton
Songs written by Will Kennard
Songs written by Tinie Tempah